Uhlich is a surname. Notable people with the surname include:

Leberecht Uhlich (1799–1872), German clergyman
Rhys Uhlich (born 1983), Australian male model

See also
Ulich
Uhlig